Meldgaard is a Danish surname. Notable people with the surname include:

 Anne-Marie Meldgaard (born 1948), Danish politician
 Jørgen Meldgaard (1927–2007), Danish archeologist
 Kristian Meldgaard (born 1983), Danish handballer
 Mikkel Meldgaard alias Mikkel Metal (born 1973), Danish techno musician
 Søren Larsen Meldgaard (1850–1894), Danish teacher and school superintendent

Danish-language surnames